Górnik Wałbrzych is a Polish men's basketball team, based in Wałbrzych, southwestern Poland, currently in Polish division I (second-tier league). Name 'Górnik' stands for 'Miners' as the city of Walbrzych was known for its thriving mining industry until the early 90s.

History

Górnik was founded in 1946. The most famous departments - basketball and football, were opened in the same year. The basketball team in 1956 won promotion to the Division I, and in 1970 it appeared for the first time in the Polish top flight. Best years for Górnik's basketball team were the 1980s. In 1981, Górnik was Polish league runner-up, in 1982 it won its first championship. In 1983 and 1986, the club was a runner-up again. Górnik won its second Polish league title in 1988. Then, in the 1990s, coal-mining industry in the city of Wałbrzych collapsed and, lacking sponsorship, Górnik started to decline. In 1995, the White and Blues left the top division due to poor financing, despite finishing 4th. Good times returned in the 2006–2007 season, when Górnik, with a new sponsor and under the name Victoria-Górnik, won promotion to the elite Dominet Basket Liga. However, it faced relegation to Division I in 2008–2009 season.

From 2009 through 2011 Górnik played in the Division I but missed playoffs both seasons. Due to financial deterioration, the club restructured and started over from the bottom, Division III (fourth-tier league). Górnik spent three seasons in Division III and won promotion in 2014. From 2014 through 2017 Górnik was contending in Division II and planned to return to Division I. In 2017–18 season, the White and Blues, playing a 7th man rotation, unexpectedly reached the finals and finished second in Division II. Next year, the team advanced to Division I playoffs as 8th seed but lost in the first round (1-3) to no. 1 seed Śląsk Wrocław.

Season 2019-20 was suspended due to the COVID-19 outbreak in Poland. At that time, few games shy to close the regular season, Górnik was leading the Division I standings with 18–5 record. Later on, it was officially named the 2020 Division I Champion. Nevertheless, was not promoted to top flight.

Honours and Achievements

Polish Basketball League:
  Winner (2): 1982, 1988
  Runner-up (3): 1981, 1983, 1986
  4th place (1989, 1995)
 U-18 Polish League Champions (1979,1980)
 U-20 Polish League Runner-up (2000)
 U-18 Polish League Bronze Medalist (2003)
 U-14 Polish League - 4th place (2011)
 U-18 Polish League - 4th place (2002)

Notable players
  Mieczysław Młynarski
  Stanisław Kiełbik
  Tadeusz Reschke
  Andrzej Adamek
  Adam Waczyński
  Kamil Chanas
  Jeremy Montgomery
  Rafał Glapiński

Seasons

Basketball teams in Poland
Basketball teams established in 1946
1946 establishments in Poland
Wałbrzych
Sport in Lower Silesian Voivodeship